Prince Diponegoro (born Bendara Raden Mas Mustahar, ; later Bendara Raden Mas Antawirya ; 11 November 1785 – 8 January 1855), also known as Dipanegara, was a Javanese prince who opposed the Dutch colonial rule. The eldest son of the Yogyakartan Sultan Hamengkubuwono III, he played an important role in the Java War between 1825 and 1830. After his defeat and capture, he was exiled to Makassar, where he died, 69 years old.

His five-year struggle against the Dutch control of Java has become celebrated by Indonesians throughout the years, acting as a source of inspiration for the fighters in the Indonesian National Revolution and nationalism in modern-day Indonesia among others. He is a national hero in Indonesia.

Early life 

Diponegoro was born on 11 November 1785 in Yogyakarta, and was the eldest son of Sultan Hamengkubuwono III of Yogyakarta. During his youth at the Yogyakartan court, major occurrences such as the dissolution of the VOC, the British invasion of Java, and subsequent return to Dutch rule took place. During the invasion, the Sultan Hamengkubuwono II, pushed aside in his power on 1810 in favor of Diponegoro's father, used the general disruption to regain control. In 1812 however he was once more removed from the throne and exiled off-Java by the British forces. In this process, Diponegoro acted as an adviser to his father and had apparently provided aid to the British forces to the point where Raffles offered him the Sultan title which he declined, perhaps due to the fact that his father was still reigning.

When the sultan died in 1814, Diponegoro was passed over for the succession to the throne in favor of his younger half brother, Hamengkubuwono IV (r. 1814–1821), who was supported by the Dutch despite the late Sultan's urging for Diponegoro to be the next Sultan. Being a devout Muslim, Diponegoro was alarmed by the relaxing of religious observance at his half brother's court in contrast with his own life of seclusion, as well as by the court's pro-Dutch policy.

In 1821, famine and plague spread in Java. Hamengkubuwono IV died in 1822 under mysterious circumstances, leaving only an infant son as heir. When the year-old boy was appointed as Sultan Hamengkubuwono V, there was a dispute over his guardianship. Diponegoro was again passed over, though he believed he had been promised the right to succeed his half brother - even though such a succession was illegal under Islamic rules. This series of natural disasters and political upheavals finally erupted into full-scale rebellion.

Fighting against the Dutch 

Dutch colonial rule was becoming unpopular among local farmers because of tax rises, crop failures and among Javanese nobles because the Dutch colonial authorities deprived them of their right to lease land. Diponogoro was widely believed to be the Ratu Adil, the just ruler predicted in the Pralembang Jayabaya. Mount Merapi's eruption in 1822 and a cholera epidemic in 1824 furthered the view that a cataclysm was imminent, eliciting widespread support for Diponegoro.

In the days leading up to the war's outbreak, no action was taken by local Dutch officials although rumors of his upcoming insurrection had been floating about. Prophesies and stories, ranging from visions at the tomb of Banten's former Sultan Ageng Tirtayasa alleged to be the ghost of Sultan Agung (the first Sultan of Mataram, predecessor of the Yogyakarta and Surakarta sultanates) to Diponegoro's contact with Nyai Roro Kidul, spread across the populace.

The beginning of the war saw large losses on the side of the Dutch, due to their lack of coherent strategy and commitment in fighting Diponegoro's guerrilla warfare. Ambushes were set up, and food supplies were denied to the Dutch troops.
The Dutch finally committed themselves to controlling the spreading rebellion by increasing the number of troops and sending General De Kock to stop the insurgency. De Kock developed a strategy of fortified camps (benteng) and mobile forces. Heavily fortified and well-defended soldiers occupied key landmarks to limit the movement of Diponegoro's troops while mobile forces tried to find and fight the rebels. From 1829, Diponegoro definitively lost the initiative and he was put in a defensive position; first in Ungaran, then in the palace of the Resident in Semarang, before finally retreating to Batavia. Many troops and leaders were defeated or deserted.

Capture and exile 

In 1830 Diponegoro's military was as good as beaten and negotiations were started. Diponegoro demanded to have a free state under a sultan and wanted to become the Muslim leader (caliph) for the whole of Java. In March 1830 he was invited to negotiate under a flag of truce. He accepted and met at the town of Magelang but was taken prisoner on 28 March despite the flag of truce. De Kock claims that he had warned several Javanese nobles to tell Diponegoro he had to lessen his previous demands or that he would be forced to take other measures.

Circumstances of Diponegoro's arrest were seen differently by himself and the Dutch. The former saw the arrest as a betrayal due to the flag of truce, while the latter declared that he had surrendered. Imagery of the event, by Javanese Raden Saleh and Dutch Nicolaas Pieneman, depicted Diponegoro differently - the former visualizing him as a defiant victim, the latter as a subjugated man. Immediately after his arrest, he was taken to Semarang and later to Batavia, where he was detained at the basement of what is today the Jakarta History Museum. On 1830, he was taken to Manado, Sulawesi by ship.

After several years in Manado, he was moved to Makassar in July 1833 where he was kept within Fort Rotterdam due to the Dutch believing that the prison was not strong enough to contain him. Despite his prisoner status, his wife Ratnaningsih and some of his followers accompanied him into exile and he received high-profile visitors including 16 year old Dutch Prince Henry in 1837. Diponegoro also composed manuscripts on Javanese history and wrote his autobiography, Babad Diponegoro, during his exile. His physical health deteriorated due to old age, and he died on 8 January 1855, where he died, 69 years old.

Before he died, Diponegoro mandated that he was to be buried in Kampung Melayu, a neighborhood then inhabited by the Chinese and the Dutch. This was followed, with the Dutch donating  of land for his graveyard which today has shrunk to just . ft.). Later, his wife and followers were also buried in the same complex. His tomb is today visited by pilgrims - often military officers and politicians.

Legacy 

Diponegoro's dynasty would survive to the present day, with their sultans holding secular powers as the governors of Special Region of Yogyakarta. In 1969, a large monument Sasana Wiratama was erected in Tegalrejo, in Yogyakarta city's perimeter, with sponsorship from the military where Diponegoro's palace was believed to have stood, although at that time there were little to show for such a building.
In 1973, under the presidency of Suharto, Diponegoro was made a National Hero of Indonesia.

Kodam IV/Diponegoro, Indonesian Army regional command for the Central Java Military Region, is named after him. The Indonesian Navy has two ships named after him. The first of these was KRI Diponegoro (306), a  commissioned in 1964 and retired in 1973. Diponegoro University in Semarang was also named after him, along with many major roads in Indonesian cities. Diponegoro is also depicted in Javanese stanzas, wayang and performing arts, including self-authored Babad Diponegoro.

The militancy of people's resistance in Java would rise again during the Indonesian Revolution, which saw the country gain independence from the Netherlands. Early Islamist political parties in Indonesia, such as the Masyumi, portrayed Diponegoro's jihad as a part of the Indonesian national struggle and by extension Islam as a prominent player in the formation of the country.

During the Royal Netherlands state visit to Indonesia in March 2020, King Willem-Alexander offered the kris of Prince Diponegoro to Indonesia, received by President Joko Widodo. His kris was long considered lost, but has now been found, after being identified by the Dutch National Museum of Ethnology in Leiden. The kris of Prince Diponegoro represents a historic importance, as a symbol of Indonesian heroic resilience and the nation's struggle for independence. The extraordinary gold-inlaid Javanese dagger previously was held as the Dutch state collection, and is now part of the collection of the Indonesian National Museum. There is great doubt whether the Kris is the original Kris of Dipenegoro. Experts think not.

References

Further reading 
 Carey, P.B.R. Babad Dipanagara : an account of the outbreak of the Java War (1825-30) : the Surakarta court version of the Babad Dipanagara Kuala Lumpur: Printed for the Council of the M.B.R.A.S. by Art Printing Works, 1981. Monograph (Royal Asiatic Society of Great Britain and Ireland. Malaysian Branch); no.9.
 Sagimun M. D. Pangeran Dipanegara : pahlawan nasional Jakarta: Proyek Biografi Pahlawan Nasional, Departemen Pendidikan dan Kebudayaan, 1976. (Indonesian language)
 Yamin, M. Sedjarah peperangan Dipanegara : pahlawan kemerdekaan Indonesia Jakarta : Pembangunan, 1950. (Indonesian language)

External links

 A Dutch web page on Diponegoro
 The web site of the Prince Raden Saleh Foundation. See the page "Capture of Prince Diponegoro"
 Pictures of Prince Diponegoro & related

 
1785 births
1855 deaths
Indonesian Muslims
Javanese people
History of Java
National Heroes of Indonesia
Dutch East Indies
People from Yogyakarta
Indonesian rebels
Indonesian royalty